George Grenville (died 1595), of Penheale, Cornwall, was an English politician.

He was a Member (MP) of the Parliament of England for Camelford in 1572, Weymouth and Melcombe Regis in 1584 and for Dunheved in 1593. His uncle, George Grenville (fl. 1571–1572), was also an MP for Dunheved.

References

Year of birth missing
1595 deaths
Politicians from Cornwall
Members of the pre-1707 English Parliament for constituencies in Cornwall
English MPs 1572–1583
English MPs 1584–1585
English MPs 1593